This is a list of Bien de Interés Cultural landmarks in the Province of Ciudad Real, Spain.

List 

 Iglesia de San Francisco, Alcázar de San Juan
 Iglesia de Santa Quiteria
 Iglesia Parroquial de Santa María la Mayor
 Torreón del Gran Príor
 Iglesia de Nuestra Señora de la Asunción, Valdepeñas
 Iglesia del Santo Cristo de la Misericordia, Valdepeñas
 Ermita de la Veracruz Valdepeñas
 Yacimiento Arqueológico Cerro de las Cabezas, Valdepeñas

References 

Ciudad Real